Damir Džumhur was the defending champion, but chose to participate in the 2016 Memphis Open instead .

Guido Andreozzi won the title, defeating Nicolás Kicker 6–0, 6–4 in the final .

Seeds

Draw

Finals

Top half

Bottom half

References
Singles Draw
Qualifying Draw

Milex Open - Singles
2016 Singles